Harry Weetman (25 October 1920 – 19 July 1972) was an English professional golfer.

Weetman won many tournaments on the British PGA circuit in the pre-European Tour era and won the Harry Vardon Trophy for lowest stroke average in 1952 and 1956. He finished in the top-10 at The Open Championship six times.

Weetman played in the Ryder Cup in 1951, 1953, 1955, 1957, 1959, 1961 and 1963 and had a 2-11-2 win–loss–tie record, with both of his wins coming in singles matches. He captained the team in 1965.

Weetman died in Redhill hospital on 19 July 1972 after being involved in a car accident on the Caterham bypass on 14 July.

Professional wins (20)

Important wins (17)

Other wins (3)
This list may be incomplete
1955 West of England Professional Championship
1957 West of England Professional Championship
1958 Southern Professional Championship

Results in major championships

Note: Weetman only played in the Masters Tournament and The Open Championship.

NT = No tournament
CUT = missed the half-way cut
WD = Withdrew
"T" indicates a tie for a place

Team appearances
Ryder Cup (representing Great Britain): 1951, 1953, 1955, 1957 (winners), 1959, 1961, 1963, 1965 (non-playing captain)
Canada Cup (representing England): 1953, 1954, 1956, 1960
Joy Cup (representing the British Isles): 1954 (winners), 1955 (winners), 1956 (winners), 1958 (winners)
Slazenger Trophy (representing Great Britain and Ireland): 1956 (winners)
Amateurs–Professionals Match (representing the Professionals): 1958, 1959 (winners)

References

External links
Golf Observer golfstats for record in major championships
Ryder Cup record
where2golf.com

English male golfers
Ryder Cup competitors for Europe
Sportspeople from Oswestry
1920 births
1972 deaths